Dolby Digital, originally synonymous with Dolby AC-3, is the name for what has now become a family of audio compression technologies developed by Dolby Laboratories. Formerly named Dolby Stereo Digital until 1995, the audio compression is lossy (except for Dolby TrueHD), based on the modified discrete cosine transform (MDCT) algorithm. The first use of Dolby Digital was to provide digital sound in cinemas from 35 mm film prints; today, it is also used for applications such as TV broadcast, radio broadcast via satellite, digital video streaming, DVDs, Blu-ray discs and game consoles.

The main basis of the Dolby AC-3 multi-channel audio coding standard is the modified discrete cosine transform (MDCT), a lossy audio compression algorithm. It is a modification of the discrete cosine transform (DCT) algorithm, which was first proposed by Nasir Ahmed in 1972 and was originally intended for image compression. The DCT was adapted into the modified discrete cosine transform (MDCT) by J.P. Princen, A.W. Johnson and Alan B. Bradley at the University of Surrey in 1987.

Dolby Laboratories adapted the MDCT algorithm along with perceptual coding principles to develop the AC-3 audio format for cinema needs. The AC-3 format was released as the Dolby Digital standard in February 1991. Dolby Digital was the earliest MDCT-based audio compression standard to be released, and was followed by other MDCT-based audio compression standards for home and portable usage, such as Sony's ATRAC (1992), the MP3 standard (1993) and AAC (1997).

Cinema 

Batman Returns was the first film to be announced as using Dolby SR-D (Spectral Recording-Digital) technology when it premiered in theaters in the summer of 1992. Dolby Digital cinema soundtracks are optically recorded on a 35 mm release print using sequential data blocks placed between every perforation hole on the sound track side of the film. A constant bit rate of 320 kbit/s is used. A charge-coupled device (CCD) scanner in the image projector picks up a scanned video image of this area, and a processor correlates the image area and extracts the digital data as an AC-3 bitstream. The data is then decoded into a 5.1 channel audio source. All film prints with Dolby Digital data also have Dolby Stereo analogue soundtracks using Dolby SR noise reduction and such prints are known as Dolby SR-D prints. The analogue soundtrack provides a fall-back option in case of damage to the data area or failure of the digital decoding; it also provides compatibility with projectors not equipped with digital soundheads. Almost all current release cinema prints are of this type and may also include SDDS data and a timecode track to synchronize CD-ROMs carrying DTS soundtracks.

The simplest way of converting existing projectors is to add a so-called penthouse digital soundhead above the projector head. However, for new projectors it made sense to use dual analogue/digital soundheads in the normal optical soundhead position under the projector head. To allow for the dual-soundhead arrangement the data is recorded 26 frames ahead of the picture. If a penthouse soundhead is used, the data must be delayed in the processor for the required amount of time, around 2 seconds. This delay can be adjusted in steps of the time between perforations, (approximately 10.4 ms).

Dolby Digital is still the predominant sound mixing format for movies, despite the introduction of Dolby Surround 7.1 and Dolby Atmos in 2010 and 2012, respectively.

Versions 
Dolby Digital has similar technologies, included in Dolby Digital EX, Dolby Digital Live, Dolby Digital Plus, Dolby Digital Surround EX, Dolby Digital Recording, Dolby Digital Cinema, Dolby Digital Stereo Creator and Dolby Digital 5.1 Creator.

Dolby Digital

Dolby Digital is the common version containing up to six discrete channels of sound. The most elaborate mode in common use involves five channels for normal-range speakers (right, center, left, right surround, left surround) and one channel ( allotted audio) for the subwoofer driven low-frequency effects. Mono and stereo modes are also supported. AC-3 supports audio sample rates up to 48 kHz.

This format has different names:
 Dolby Digital
 DD (an abbreviation for Dolby Digital, often combined with channel count; for instance, DD 2.0, DD 5.1)
 AC-3 (Audio Codec 3, Advanced Codec 3, Acoustic Coder 3. [These are backronyms. Adaptive Transform Acoustic Coding 3 is a separate format developed by Sony.])
 ATSC A/52 (name of the standard)
 Before 1996, was marketed as Dolby Surround AC-3, Dolby Stereo Digital, and Dolby SRD.  
In 1991, a limited experimental release of Star Trek VI: The Undiscovered Country in Dolby Digital played in 3 US theatres. In 1992, Batman Returns is the first movie to be released in Dolby Digital. In 1995, the LaserDisc version of Clear and Present Danger featured the first home theater Dolby Digital mix, quickly followed by True Lies, Stargate, Forrest Gump, and Interview with the Vampire among others.

Dolby Digital EX 
Dolby Digital EX is similar in practice to Dolby's earlier Pro Logic format, which utilized matrix technology to add a center surround channel and single rear surround channel to stereo soundtracks. EX adds an extension to the standard 5.1 channel Dolby Digital codec in the form of matrixed rear channels, creating 6.1 or 7.1 channel output.

Dolby Digital Surround EX 
It provides an economical and backwards-compatible means for 5.1 soundtracks to carry a sixth, center back surround channel for improved localization of effects. The extra surround channel is matrix encoded onto the discrete left surround and right surround channels of the 5.1 mix, much like the front center channel on Dolby Pro Logic encoded stereo soundtracks. The result can be played without loss of information on standard 5.1 systems, or played in 6.1 or 7.1 on systems with Surround EX decoding and added speakers. A number of DVDs have a Dolby Digital Surround EX audio option.

The theater version of Dolby Digital Surround EX was introduced in 1999, when Dolby and Skywalker Sound, a division of Lucasfilm Ltd., co-developed Dolby Digital Surround EX™ for the release of Star Wars: Episode I – The Phantom Menace. Dolby Digital Surround EX has since been used on the DVD releases of the Star Wars prequel and original trilogies.

Dolby Digital Live 
Dolby Digital Live (DDL) is a real-time encoding technology for interactive media such as video games. It converts any audio signals on a PC or game console into a 5.1-channel 16-bit/48 kHz Dolby Digital format at 640 kbit/s and transports it via a single S/PDIF cable. A similar technology known as DTS Connect is available from competitor DTS. An important benefit of this technology is that it enables the use of digital multichannel sound with consumer sound cards, which are otherwise limited to digital PCM stereo or analog multichannel sound because S/PDIF over RCA, BNC, and TOSLINK can only support two-channel PCM, Dolby Digital multichannel audio, and DTS multichannel audio. HDMI was later introduced, and it can carry uncompressed multichannel PCM, lossless compressed multichannel audio, and lossy compressed digital audio. However, Dolby Digital Live is still useful with HDMI to allow transport of multichannel audio over HDMI to devices that are unable to handle uncompressed multichannel PCM.

Dolby Digital Live is available in sound cards using various manufacturers' audio chipsets. The SoundStorm, used for the Xbox game console and certain nForce2 motherboards, used an early form of this technology. DDL is available on motherboards with codecs such as Realtek's ALC882D, ALC888DD and ALC888H. Other examples include some C-Media PCI sound cards and Creative Labs' X-Fi and Z series sound cards, whose drivers have enabled support for DDL.

NVIDIA later decided to drop DDL support in their motherboards due to the cost of involved royalties, leaving an empty space in this regard in the sound cards market.
Then in June 2005 came Auzentech, which with its X-Mystique PCI card, provided the first consumer sound card with Dolby Digital Live support.

Initially no Creative X-Fi based sound cards supported DDL (2005~2007) but a collaboration of Creative and Auzentech resulted in the development of the Auzentech Prelude, the first X-Fi card to support DDL. Originally planned to extend DDL support to all X-Fi based sound cards (except the 'Xtreme Audio' line which is incapable of DDL hardware implementation), the plan was dropped because Dolby licensing would have required a royalty payment for all X-Fi cards and, problematically, those already sold.
In 2008, Creative released the X-Fi Titanium series of sound cards which fully supports Dolby Digital Live while leaving all PCI versions of Creative X-Fi still lacking support for DDL.

Since September 2008, all Creative X-Fi based sound cards support DDL (except the 'Xtreme Audio' and its based line such as Prodigy 7.1e, which is incapable of DDL in hardware). X-Fi's case differs.

While they forgot about the plan, programmer Daniel Kawakami made a hot issue by applying Auzentech Prelude DDL module back to Creative X-Fi cards by disguising the hardware identity as Auzentech Prelude.

Creative Labs alleged Kawakami violated their intellectual property and demanded he cease distributing his modified drivers.

Eventually Creative struck an agreement with Dolby Laboratories regarding the Dolby license royalty by arranging that the licensing cost be folded into the purchase price of the Creative X-Fi PCI cards rather than as a royalty paid by Creative themselves. Based on the agreement, in September 2008 Creative began selling the Dolby Digital Live packs enabling Dolby Digital Live on Creative's X-Fi PCI series of sound cards. It can be purchased and downloaded from Creative. Subsequently, Creative added their DTS Connect pack to the DDL pack at no added cost.

Dolby Digital Plus 

E-AC-3 (Dolby Digital Plus) is an enhanced coding system based on the AC-3 codec. It offers increased bitrates (up to 6.144 Mbit/s), support for even more audio channels (up to 15.1 discrete channels in the future), and improved coding techniques (only at low data rates) to reduce compression artifacts, enabling lower data rates than those supported by AC-3 (e.g. 5.1-channel audio at 256 kbit/s). It is not backward compatible with existing AC-3 hardware, though E-AC-3 codecs generally are capable of transcoding to AC-3 for equipment connected via S/PDIF. E-AC-3 decoders can also decode AC-3 bitstreams. The fourth generation Apple TV supports E-AC-3. The discontinued HD DVD system directly supported E-AC-3. Blu-ray Disc offers E-AC-3 as an option to graft added channels onto an otherwise 5.1 AC-3 stream, as well as for delivery of secondary audio content (e.g. director's commentary) that is intended to be mixed with the primary audio soundtrack in the Blu-ray Disc player.

Dolby AC-4 

Dolby AC-4 is an audio compression standard supporting multiple audio channels and/or audio objects. Support for 5.1 channel audio is mandatory and additional channels up to 7.1.4 are optional. AC-4 provides a 50% reduction in bit rate over AC-3/Dolby Digital Plus.

Dolby TrueHD 

Dolby TrueHD, developed by Dolby Laboratories, is an advanced lossless audio codec based on Meridian Lossless Packing. Support for the codec was mandatory for HD DVD and is optional for Blu-ray Disc hardware. Dolby TrueHD supports 24-bit bit depths and sample rates up to 192 kHz. Maximum bitrate is 18 Mbit/s while it supports up to 16 audio channels (HD DVD and Blu-ray Disc standards currently limit the maximum number of audio channels to eight). It supports metadata, including dialog normalization and Dynamic Range Control.

Channel configurations 
Although commonly associated with the 5.1 channel configuration, Dolby Digital allows a number of different channel selections. The options are:

 Dolby Digital 1/0 – Mono (center only)
 Dolby Digital 2/0 – 2-channel stereo (left + right), optionally carrying matrixed Dolby Surround
 Dolby Digital 3/0 – 3-channel stereo (left, center, right)
 Dolby Digital 2/1 – 2-channel stereo with mono surround (left, right, surround)
 Dolby Digital 3/1 – 3-channel stereo with mono surround (left, center, right, surround)
 Dolby Digital 2/2 – 4-channel quadraphonic (left, right, left surround, right surround)
 Dolby Digital 3/2 – 5-channel surround (left, center, right, left surround, right surround)

These configurations optionally include the extra low-frequency effects (LFE) channel. The last two with stereo surrounds optionally use Dolby Digital EX matrix encoding to add an extra Rear Surround channel.

Many Dolby Digital decoders are equipped with downmixing to distribute encoded channels to speakers. This includes such functions as playing surround information through the front speakers if surround speakers are unavailable, and distributing the center channel to left and right if no center speaker is available. When outputting to separate equipment over a 2-channel connection, a Dolby Digital decoder can optionally encode the output using Dolby Surround to preserve surround information.

The '.1' in 5.1, 7.1 etc. refers to the LFE channel, which is also a discrete channel.

Applications 
Dolby Digital audio is used on DVD-Video and other purely digital media, like home cinema. In this format, the AC-3 bitstream is interleaved with the video and control bitstreams.

The system is used in bandwidth-limited applications other than DVD-Video, such as digital TV. The AC-3 standard allows a maximum coded bit rate of 640 kbit/s. 35 mm film prints use a fixed rate of 320 kbit/s, which is the same as the maximum bit rate for 2-channel MP3. DVD-Video discs are limited to 448 kbit/s, although many players can successfully play higher-rate bitstreams (which are non-compliant with the DVD specification). HD DVD limits AC-3 to 448 kbit/s. ATSC and digital cable standards limit AC-3 to 448 kbit/s. Blu-ray Disc, the PlayStation 3 and the Xbox game console can output an AC-3 signal at a full 640 kbit/s. Some Sony PlayStation 2 console games are able to output AC-3 standard audio as well, primarily during pre-rendered cutscenes.

Dolby is part of a group of organizations involved in the development of AAC (Advanced Audio Coding), part of MPEG specifications, and considered the successor to MP3.

Dolby Digital Plus (DD-Plus) and TrueHD are supported in HD-DVD, as mandatory codecs, and in Blu-ray Disc, as optional codecs.

Dolby technologies in packaged media formats

AC3RF
In the LaserDisc world AC3RF is the term widely placed on connectors of players that support Dolby Digital. Specific demodulators and receivers from the LaserDisc era (1990s thru early 2000s) also include placement of this term on connectors.

LaserDisc titles with Dolby Digital tracks often have THX logo on their covers.

Technical details
The data layout of AC-3 is described by simplified "C-like" language in official specifications. An AC-3 stream is a series of frames; the frame size code is used along with the sample rate code to determine the number of (2-byte)
words before the next syncword. Channel blocks can be either long, in which case the entire block is processed as single modified discrete cosine transform, or short, in which case two half length transforms are performed on the block. Below is a simplified AC-3 header. A detailed description is in the ATSC "Digital Audio Compression (AC-3) (E-AC-3) Standard", section 5.4.

License 

AC3 was covered by patents (expired since March 2017). Patents were used to ask to pay a commercial license to publish an application that decodes AC3. This led some audio app developers to ban AC3 from their apps, although the open source VLC media player supported AC-3 audio without having paid for any kind of patent license fee.

In Dolby's 2005 original and amended S-1 filings with the SEC, Dolby acknowledged that "Patents relating to our Dolby Digital technologies expire between 2008 and 2017."

The last patent covering AC-3 expired March 20, 2017, so it is now generally free to use.

Open source implementation 
A free ATSC A/52 (AC3) stream decoder, liba52, is available under the GNU General Public License. FFmpeg and the VLC media player each include code for handling AC-3.

See also 
 C-Media – producer of DDL audio chipsets used in many sound cards and motherboards
 Dialnorm – Dolby Digital metadata parameter controlling decoder gain
 Dolby Laboratories – company history and technology development
 Dolby noise-reduction system – analogue recording on magnetic tape, including compact cassette tapes
 Dolby Stereo – first active matrix analogue surround sound format
 Dolby SR – Recording process, noise reduction and expander with superior fidelity over earlier A-type system
 Dolby Surround – Marketed consumer name of the theatrical Dolby Stereo analog surround format
 Dolby Pro Logic – Reference active 2:4 matrix decoding system used on Dolby Stereo soundtracks and Dolby Surround [after 1987] 
 Dolby TrueHD – lossless codec for HD DVD and Blu-ray Disc
 Dolby E – allows 6 to 8 channels of audio to be compressed into an AES3 digital audio stream
 DTS (sound system) – formerly Digital Theater Systems
 Home cinema
 Loudspeaker
 SoundStorm – a real-time AC-3 encoder included in certain nForce2 motherboards
 THX

References

External links 

, Dolby Laboratories
ATSC standards
Digital Audio Compression Standard (AC-3, E-AC-3) at the ATSC website

American inventions
Audio codecs
Consumer electronics
Dolby Laboratories
Film sound production
High-definition television
Surround sound
Audiovisual introductions in 1986
Development organizations